Janusz Dobosz (23 January 1936 – 11 April 2002) was a footballer who played as a midfielder. Being born in Radom, Dobosz played for his local team Bron Radom, being listed as one of the club's all time best players in 2016, the club's 70th anniversary. In 1960 he played for Lechia Gdańsk in the I liga, Poland's top division. He made his Lechia debut on 11 May 1960 in a 3-1 defeat against Odra Opole. He died in Radom on 11 April 2002, aged 66.

References

1936 births
2002 deaths
Lechia Gdańsk players
Broń Radom players
People from Radom
Polish footballers
Association football midfielders